Céline Arnauld (born Carolina Goldstein on 20 September 1885, Călăraşi (Romania), died on 23 December 1952 by suicide in Paris) was a writer associated with Dadaism.

Arnauld’s poetry appears earliest in her first published volume of 1914, titled La Lanterne magique (The Magic Lantern).  Poèmes à claires-voies (Openwork Poems) of 1920, Point de mire (Focal Point) of 1921, and Guêpier de diamants (Diamond Trap) of 1923 followed during the Paris Dada years. She finds its fullness in La nuit reve tout haut (1934) and in Heures intactes (1936). She published until 1948, though all of her texts are rare and some are considered lost.  While occasionally working in prose, Arnauld a consistently published poet, albeit by small publishers.  Her first and only published novel, Tournevire, is an experimental text of 1919.  She was published in the Dada journals DADAphone, Cannibale, and Z.  These early poems revolved around the theme of transport, referring to modern travel means and metaphysical transit.

She was a director of the short-lived but appreciated journal Projecteur and a collaborator of 391, Z and other Dadaist journals.

Arnauld was also part of Dada performances.  In March 1920, she is credited in the program of the Manifestation Dada de la Maison d’Oeuvre as “the pregnant woman” in “La Première Aventure Céleste de M. Antipyrine” (The First Heavenly Adventure of Mr. Antipyrine) by Tristan Tzara.  Two months later, she is recorded as an author and performer of a dialogue called “Jeu d’échecs” (Chessboard) in the Festival Dada at the Salle Gaveau.

A pamphlet of poetry published by Clayton Eshleman in 1977 called “The Gospel of Celine [sic] Arnauld.”  Eshleman, asked by Arnauld to translate some of her work, wrote that he found her works to be “run-of-the-mill French poetry, worn-out language, superficial emotion, nothing new in short.”  However, he still was inspired to create his own version of a narrative while in a trance.  In her study of Arnauld for her book “Dada’s Women,” Ruth Hemus allows the American poet creative license but states that he “failed to comprehend the conditions under which Arnauld was writing, was ignorant of the rebellion inherent in her participation in Dada and did not perceive any aspects of innovation in her body of work.”

Céline Arnauld was married to Paul Dermée (1886–1951), Belgian Writer, Poet, Literary Critic.

References
Jean Rousselot. Dictionnaire de la poesie francaise contemporaine 1968, Auge, Guillon, Hollier -Larousse, Mooreau et Cie.-Librairie Larousse, Paris 

Dada
1885 births
1952 deaths
1952 suicides
Suicides in France
Romanian emigrants to France